Trash talk is a form of insult usually found in sports events, although it is not exclusive to sports or similarly characterized events. It is often used to intimidate the opposition and/or make them less confident in their abilities as to win easier, but it can also be used in a humorous spirit. Trash-talk is often characterized by use of hyperbole or figurative language, such as "Your team can't run! You run like honey on ice!" Puns and other wordplay are commonly used.

Trash-talk was most famously used by heavyweight boxing champion Muhammad Ali in the 1960s and 70s. In 1963, Ali even released a popular full-length record album consisting largely of trash-talk poetry. It was entitled I Am the Greatest!, a phrase that became his signature line. Since then, it has become common for boxers, wrestlers, and many other sports competitors to use trash-talk. However, in amateur sports ranks, trash talking is generally frowned upon as unsportsmanlike conduct (especially in youth leagues). Former UFC Featherweight and Lightweight Champion Conor McGregor is a more recent example of a prominent trash-talker, he is considered by most to be the greatest trash-talker in MMA history. Former UFC fighter Chael Sonnen is also considered by many to be one of the greatest trash-talkers MMA has ever had. Although the practice of trying to distract opponents by verbal abuse is common to virtually all sports, other sports sometimes have their own terminology for verbal abuse: for example, cricket calls it sledging and in ice hockey it is called chirping.

Trash-talk has become a debatable term especially in North American sports, with the greatest trash talkers being acknowledged for both their trash talking skills as much as their athletic and mental abilities.

Usage 
In sports, trash-talk most commonly comes in the form of insults to an opposing player's playing ability or physical appearance which is ethically not acceptable. The intended effects of trash-talk are to create rivalry between the players and increase psychological pressure of opposing players to perform well or to stop the trash-talker from performing well. The quality of performance of players under the pressure of trash-talk is debated, but one study found that participants who were subject to a trash-talk message exerted more effort in completing their task and perceived their opponent with more incivility and rivalry, when compared to participants who were subject to a neutral, irrelevant, or no message at all.

While trash-talking frequently focuses on sporting attributes such as physical ability and athleticism, there is also significant trash-talking off-topic including opponent's sexual behavior and relationships. Trash-talk is more prevalent in contact sports than non-contact sports, and it is also more prevalent between male competitors than female competitors.

Types

Smack talk

Smack talk is a slang term seen in chat channels in chat room, blog, and massively multiplayer online game (MMOG) conversations. The term came about in the early 1990s. It generally refers to the use of threatening or intentionally inflammatory language. Smack talk can also be used with bullying, whether that be face-to-face interaction, or cyber-bullying.

Smack talk is also a slang term used in sports. It refers to inflammatory comments made by a person or team in order to insult, anger, annoy or be boisterous toward their opponents. Although it began as a term used by sports fans and athletes, it has spread to all areas of culture where competition takes place. In the United States, it is synonymous with "trash talk".

The social interaction within MMOGs has been observed to be quite active and often leads to long-term social relationships. MMOG groups, such as "teams", "guilds" or "corporations", are composed of groups of people who often initially have no other social contact or interactions with each other. As a result, their conversations contain a subtext of discovery of language skills, social values, and intentions. One of the first indicators of these is the use or offense taken by the usage of smack talk. For the purpose of setting a social context or to comply with MMOG end user license agreement restrictions, MMOG groups may establish bylaws, traditions, or rules (formal or informal) that either permit, discourage, or prohibit the use of smack talk in their conversations and postings.

Talking Shit

Talking shit is a term and type of trash-talk that refers to various types of derogatory language aimed at an individual or any type of entity, such as a group or organisation. Talking shit can be used as a tactic in fighting or brawling, used to draw attention to the matter among onlookers. This is a term that has been coined more recently and is used in reference when someone talks negatively about another person, concept, organisation, or entity. This may or may not include spreading false ideas. The same term can also be used to describe something spoken which is not true, uninteresting or irrelevant.  It may be a contraction of Talking Bullshit.  

It is not to be confused with shitposting, which is when someone posts "content aggressively, ironically, and trollishly poor quality" to an online forum.

Morality 
The ethics of using trash-talk as a strategy is debated. In sports, trash talking is often seen as unsportsmanlike, as throwing insults at opposing players goes beyond the limits and conventions of the game. Some argue, on the other hand, that trash talking can be used as a valid strategy to increase tension in opponents and thus benefit from opponents' poor performance, since any action not explicitly banned in the rules is permitted.

In popular culture
Given the rapid increase in the popularity of the phrase, its appearance in popular media and culture is extensive. One of the earliest references can be found in Dobie Gray's hit song from 1965, "The 'In' Crowd," in which the third verse describes members "spendin' cash, talkin' trash" as part of the depiction of a desirable group membership. Uses have become ubiquitous, particularly as part of the birth of hip-hop culture and rap music. References are now likely too numerous to manage a list here in Wikipedia, although there are some notable examples of it's unique uses.

See also

 The dozens
 Fighting words
 Flaming (Internet)
 Flyting
 Hip hop music
 Profanity
 Sledging (cricket)
 Wolf-whistling

References

Humour
Pejorative terms
Sports culture